Ngia Selengbe is a Congolese rugby union player for the  in the Currie Cup. His regular position is wing.

Selengbe was named in the  side for the 2022 Currie Cup Premier Division.

References

South African rugby union players
Democratic Republic of the Congo rugby union players
Living people
Rugby union wings
Lions (United Rugby Championship) players
Golden Lions players
2001 births